Ardis is a female first name of Irish and Scottish origin. Its meaning is fervent or “blooming meadow” as a variation of Ardyce.  Notable people with the name include:

 Ardis Fagerholm (born 1971),  a Swedish pop singer
 Ardis Joan Krainik (1928 – 1997), an American mezzo-soprano opera singer

References